HTV3 is a channel of Ho Chi Minh City Television in Vietnam and used to be administered by Tri Viet Media Corporation (TVM Corp.). Originally, HTV3 aired shows for youth audiences. HTV3 always has the copyright from the creator and production of all the shows broadcast. It is broadcast 24 hours a day on VTC, K+, AVG television services in Vietnam.

History
HTV3 channel was set up in 2004 by Ho Chi Minh City Television (HTV) with blocks for children. In 2008, HTV was collaborated with Tri Viet Media Corporation (TVM Corp.) to develop the channel. Between 2015 and 2016, HTV3 was transferred to TTN Media. From 2017 to 2022, Purpose Media took over the channel. Since 1 July 2017, DreamsTV was created for the broadcasts.

From 1 November 2022, HTV3 officially stopped broadcasting (with DreamsTV) and was returned to Ho Chi Minh City Television for management. After this point, the channel mainly replays programs from other channels of HTV.

See also
List of broadcasts on Ho Chi Minh City Television (HTV)

References

External links

Mass media in Ho Chi Minh City
Television networks in Vietnam
Television channels and stations established in 2008
Classic television networks